A Blessed Life (Chinese: 吉人天相) is a Singaporean Chinese sitcom sponsored by Pioneer Generation Package, produced by MediaCorp Channel 8. It stars Li Nanxing, Chen Liping, Zhu Houren, Brandon Wong, Richard Low and Youyi as the main characters of the sitcom. It revolves around a group of old men fulfilling their dreams to perform band on stage.

Cast

Main cast

Cameo appearance

Episodic guide

Awards & Nominations
A Blessed Life is nominated for two award categories in Star Awards 2016.

Star Awards 2016

See also
List of MediaCorp Channel 8 Chinese drama series (2010s)

References

Singapore Chinese dramas
2015 Singaporean television series debuts
2015 Singaporean television series endings
Channel 8 (Singapore) original programming